The 2019 Spring United Premier Soccer League season is the 12th season of the UPSL.

Pro Premier

Team changes
These tables show changes made since the 2018 Spring season for the Atlanta Caribbean Division, Midwest Conference, Northeast Conference, and Southwest Conference which did not participate in the 2018 Fall season. All other changes are compared to the Fall season.

Incoming teams

Rebranded teams

Transferred teams

Outgoing teams

Division changes
The Midwest Conference's divisions were realigned; in 2018 they were Central, East, North, and West. For 2019, they are Central, East, South, and West and cover different areas.
The Northeast Conference's American and Patriot Divisions were merged into a single table.
The Florida Central Division was split into East and West sections. Deportivo Lake Mary was transferred to the East section while Huracan FC, Interunited Academy, Sporting Orlando, and The Institute FC were transferred to the West section.
The Florida South Division was split into Florida Dade/Broward and Florida Palm Beach divisions. Florida Soccer Soldiers, Hebraica Miami FC, Hialeah City FC, Miami Sun FC, UD Miami FC were transferred to the Florida Dade/Broward Division while Florida Wolves FC, FSI Vultures FC, Hurricane FC, International Soccer Association, and Palm Beach Spartans were transferred to the Florida Palm Beach Division.
The Mid-Atlantic Division's South section was further split into A and B sections. Broncos United FC and San Lee FC were transferred to the A section while Savannah Clovers FC and Soda City FC were transferred to the B section.
The Wild West Division's North and South sections were merged into a single table.

Competition format
Teams are divided into conferences, some of which are further subdivided into divisions. Following the regular season, teams compete in a playoff tournament to determine a single national champion. Unless specified otherwise, all playoff matches are contested over a single leg, hosted by the team with the best points-per-game ratio. Extra time is not used in any round; matches drawn after 90 minutes advance directly to a penalty shootout.

Central Conference: Teams are divided into Heart, North, and South divisions. Each division plays a double round robin for 14, 12, and 14 matches respectively. The top two teams from each division plus the two best third place teams by points-per-game qualify for the playoffs.
Midwest Conference: Teams are divided into Central, East, South, and West divisions. Each division plays a double round robin for 10 matches. The regular season champion of each division qualifies for the playoffs which are held at a single location to be determined.
Mountain Conference: Teams play a double round robin for 16 matches.
Northeast Conference: Teams play a single round robin for eight matches.
Southeast Conference: Teams are divided into Florida Central, Florida Dade/Broward, Florida Palm Beach, and Mid-Atlantic divisions.
Florida Central Division: Teams are further divided into East and West sections. Each team plays the other seven teams within its section plus five teams in the other section for a total of 12 matches.
Florida Dade/Broward Division: Teams play a single round robin for 11 matches.
Florida Palm Beach Division: Teams play two of their rivals twice and the rest once for an 11 match schedule.
Mid-Atlantic Division: Teams are further divided into North, South A, and South B sections. Each section plays a double round robin for 10, 8, and 10 matches respectively.
Southwest Conference: Teams play two of their rivals twice and the rest once for a 10 match schedule.
Western Conference: Teams are divided into SoCal and Wild West divisions. Each division determines its own champion with the two divisional champions then matched up to determine the conference champion.
SoCal Division: Teams are further divided into North and South sections. Each section plays a double round robin for 14 matches. The top three teams in each section qualify for the playoffs, with the section leaders receiving byes to the divisional semifinals. The last placed team in each section is relegated to the Championship.
Wild West Division: Teams play each opponent either zero, one, or two times with no discernible pattern for a total of 10 matches. The top eight teams qualify for the playoffs.

Standings

Alaska-Last Frontier Division standings

Central Heart Division standings

Central North Division standings

Central South Division standings

Midwest Central Division standings

Midwest East Division standings

Midwest South Division standings

Midwest West Division standings

Mountain Conference standings

Northeast Conference standings

Atlanta Caribbean Division standings

Florida Central Division East standings

Florida Central Division West standings

Florida Dade/Broward Division standings

Florida Palm Beach Division standings

Mid-Atlantic Division North standings

Mid-Atlantic Division South A standings

Mid-Atlantic Division South B standings

Southwest Conference standings

SoCal Division North standings

SoCal Division South standings

Wild West Division standings

Playoffs

Central Conference playoffs

Midwest Conference playoffs

Mountain Conference playoffs

Atlanta Caribbean Division playoffs

Florida Central Division playoffs
{{#invoke:RoundN|main|columns=3
|RD1=Quarterfinals
|RD2=Semifinals
|team-width=220
|omit_blanks=yes
|flex_tree=yes
|bold_winner=high
|June 19 – Lake Myrtle Sports Complex|Tropics SC|3|GOSA|0
|June 16 – Celebration High School|OFC Barca|1(5)|Sporting Orlando|1(6)
|June 14 – ESPN Wide World of Sports|Leg A-Z Soccer|3|The Institute FC|2
|June 15 – Oldsmar Sports Complex|St. Petersburg FC Aztecs|3|Macca Ballers FC|4
|June 26 – Lake Myrtle Sports Complex|Tropics SC|3|Sporting Orlando|0
|June 22 – Veterans Memorial Park|Leg A-Z Soccer|2|Macca Ballers FC|4
|June 29 – Lake Myrtle Sports Complex|Tropics SC|3|Macca Ballers FC|1
}}

Florida South Division playoffs

Mid-Atlantic Division playoffs

Southwest Conference playoffs

SoCal Division playoffs

Wild West Division playoffs

National playoffs

Championship
Team changes
Incoming teams

Outgoing teams

Division changes
The Central North Division added a Championship level.

Competition formatCentral Conference: Only the North Division features a Championship level. Teams play a double round robin for 12 matches.Southeast Conference: The Atlanta Caribbean Division features only at the Championship level and does not promote to the Pro Premier. Among divisions with Pro Premier levels, only the Florida Central Division features a Championship level.Atlanta Caribbean Division: Teams play a single round robin for nine matches.Florida Central Division: Teams play a double round robin for 14 matches. All eight teams qualify for the playoffs.Western Conference: Only the SoCal Division features a Championship level. Teams are divided into North and South sections. Each section plays a single round robin for 13 matches. The regular season champion of each section is promoted. The second place team in each section hosts the third place team in the other section in a playoff match to determine two further promoted teams.

Standings
Central North Division standings

Patriot Division standings

Florida Central Division standings

SoCal Division North standings

SoCal Division South standings

Promotional Playoffs
Florida Central Division playoffs

SoCal Division playoffs

League One
Team changes
Incoming teams

Division changes
The Central North Division added a League One level.

Competition formatCentral Conference: Only the North Division features a League One level. Teams play a triple round robin for 12 matches.Western Conference''': Only the SoCal Division features a League One level. Teams play a double round robin for 14 matches.

Standings

Central North Division standings

SoCal Division standings

References

United Premier Soccer League seasons
2019 in American soccer leagues